Acostemmini is a tribe of leafhoppers in the subfamily Deltocephalinae. Acostemmini contains 12 genera and around 30 species. The tribe is found throughout tropical Africa, the Indian subcontinent and New Guinea. The highest diversity is found in Madagascar including an endemic genus, Ikelibeloha.

Genera 
There are currently 12 described genera in the tribe Acostemmini:

References 

Deltocephalinae